Dawn is a 2015 black-and-white Latvian drama film directed by Laila Pakalniņa about Pavlik Morozov, who denounced his father. It was selected as the Latvian entry for the Best Foreign Language Film at the 89th Academy Awards but it was not nominated. It's a coproduction with Poland and Estonia.

Cast
 Vilis Daudziņš
 Antons Grauds
 Andris Keišs
 Liena Šmukste
 Wiktor Zborowski

See also
 List of submissions to the 89th Academy Awards for Best Foreign Language Film
 List of Latvian submissions for the Academy Award for Best Foreign Language Film

References

External links
 National Film Centre Latvia
 

2015 films
2015 drama films
Latvian drama films
Latvian black-and-white films
Latvian-language films
Films directed by Laila Pakalniņa